The Tit and the Moon is a 1994 Spanish/French film, directed by Bigas Luna. It entered the competition at the 51st Venice International Film Festival.

Plot
The film is about a nine-year-old boy's obsession with women's breasts. Tete becomes jealous of his baby brother who is breast fed by their mother. Tete goes on a personal mission to find the perfect pair of lactating breasts to feed on. Estrellita, a beautiful French dancer (Mathilda May), arrives in town, the answer to Tete's prayers. Unfortunately for Tete, Estrellita is the attention of many adult men's affections including her husband Maurice (Gérard Darmon), an older man working as the other half of her travelling act, and attractive Flamenco-singing teenager Miguel (Miguel Poveda). With this amount of competition will Tete ever fulfil his wish?

Cast
 Biel Durán as Tete
 Mathilda May as Estrellita
 Gérard Darmon as Maurice
 Miguel Poveda as Miquel
 Abel Folk as Father
 Laura Mañá as Mare
 Genís Sánchez as Stallone
 Xavier Massé as El Abuelo
 Victoria Lepori as La de las tetas
 Xus Estruch as La madre de Stallone
 Jane Harvey as La Caballé
 Vanessa Isbert as Novia de Stallone
 Jordi Busquets as Cap Colla
 Salvador Anglada as Casteller
 Javier Bardem (small, uncredited role)

References

External links
 
 

Reviews
 Review of the UK Region 0 DVD at DVD Times

1994 romantic comedy films
1990s sex comedy films
1994 films
Catalan-language films
French romantic comedy films
French sex comedy films
Films directed by Bigas Luna
Films shot in Barcelona
Spanish multilingual films
French multilingual films
French coming-of-age films
1990s French-language films
Madrid in fiction
Spanish coming-of-age films
1990s Spanish-language films
Spanish erotic films
Films scored by Nicola Piovani
1994 multilingual films
1990s French films
1990s Spanish films